Princess Noor could refer to:

Princess Noor bint Asem, of Jordan
Noor Pahlavi, oldest child of Reza Pahlavi, former Crown Prince of Iran

See also
Queen Noor of Jordan